This is a list of Missouri Tigers men's basketball head coaches.

Coaching records

*Watkins served as interim head coach for 7 games following the resignation of Quin Snyder.

References

Missouri

Missouri Tigers basketball, men's, coaches